Geoffrey "Geoff" Sleight (born 20 June 1943 in Barnsley, England) is an Australian former footballer who played as a winger.

He joined Bolton Wanderers after leaving school, and made his debut against Manchester City in September 1961. Sleight made just two appearances for the first-team before being released. He went on to play for Wigan Athletic, Buxton and Mossley, where he briefly acted as caretaker manager in November and December 1976, winning four of his five matches in charge. After Howard Wilkinson was appointed as permanent manager, he left to join Droylsden, before returning to Mossley in 1978. He soon moved onto become player-manager at Frickley Athletic, and guided the team to promotion to the Football Conference in 1980. After retiring, Sleight later became chief scout for Howard Wilkinson at Leeds United between 1993 and 1996.

Sleight also represented the Australia national team on two occasions, including an appearance in their first ever World Cup qualifying game against North Korea. North Korea won the match 6–1.

References

External links
Profile at OzFootball
Profile  at MossleyWeb

1943 births
English footballers
Australian soccer players
Association football wingers
Australia international soccer players
Bolton Wanderers F.C. players
Wigan Athletic F.C. players
Buxton F.C. players
Mossley A.F.C. players
Frickley Athletic F.C. players
Living people
Mossley A.F.C. managers
Frickley Athletic F.C. managers
Goole Town F.C. managers
English football managers
Stalybridge Celtic F.C. players
Droylsden F.C. players
Sydney FC Prague players